= 9/10 =

9/10 may refer to:

- September 10 (month-day date notation)
- October 9 (day-month date notation)
- The fraction, nine tenths
